Benefit of the Doubt is a 1967 documentary on Peter Brook's anti-Vietnam protest play, with the Royal Shakespeare Company, known under the title US. It was filmed at London's Aldwych Theatre and features Peter Brook, Michael Kustow, Michael Williams and Glenda Jackson. It was directed by Peter Whitehead.

Peter Brook also adapted US as a film, Tell Me Lies, and this was released in 1968.

References

External links

Film's entry on Peter Whitehead's website

1967 films
British documentary films
1967 documentary films
Documentary films about theatre
Documentary films about the Vietnam War
1960s English-language films
1960s British films